Usha Bachani is an Indian television actress.

Filmography

Television

References

External links 
 

Actresses from Mumbai
Indian soap opera actresses
Indian television actresses
People from Mumbai
21st-century Indian actresses
Actresses in Hindi television
Living people
1968 births